Ricardo Sousa da Cruz Maia (born 21 July 1991) is a football player who currently plays for Timor-Leste national football team as a forward.

International goals
Scores and results list Timor Leste's goal tally first.

References

1991 births
Living people
East Timorese footballers
Timor-Leste international footballers
Footballers at the 2014 Asian Games
Association football forwards
Asian Games competitors for East Timor